Jabuz (also known as Khābūz and Jābūs) is a village in Sheshtaraz Rural District, Sheshtaraz District, Khalilabad County, Razavi Khorasan Province, Iran. At the 2006 census, its population was 3,044, in 891 families.

References 

Populated places in Khalilabad County

AliOmrani(AMC)